Wahlbom is a Swedish surname. Notable people with the surname include:

 Carl Wahlbom (1810–1858), Swedish painter, illustrator, and sculptor
 Nils Wahlbom (1886–1937), Swedish film actor
 Magnus Wahlbom (born 1945), Swedish chess master

Swedish-language surnames